Baseball Manitoba, or the Manitoba Baseball Association, is the governing body for amateur baseball in the province of Manitoba, Canada.  It was founded in 1968 and is the provincial branch of Baseball Canada.  Its role is to promote the sport, encourage player development, and oversee all organized competition in Manitoba.  It currently has approximately 14,000 members.

Leagues
Senior
Border West Senior League
Brandon Senior Baseball League
Santa Clara Senior League
Southwest Senior League
Thompson Senior League
Winnipeg Senior Baseball League
Junior
Manitoba Junior Baseball League
Minor
Bonivital Minor
Brandon Minor
Carillon Minor
Interlake Minor
Red Lake Minor
Midwest Minor
North Winnipeg Minor
Oil Dome Minor
Parkland Minor
Pembina Hills Minor
Portage Minor
Red River Valley Sports League
South Central Minor
St. James Minor
Winnipeg South Minor
Winnipeg AAA Baseball

Management Committee
President - Tony Siemens (Rosenort)
Past President - Ken Sharpe (Minnedosa)
Vice-President Finance - David Whitehead (Winnipeg)
Vice-President Policy - Winston Smith (Winnipeg)
Vice-President Coaching - Louis Cote (La Broquerie )
Vice-President Competition - Alex Grenier (Ile Des Chenes)
Vice-President High Performance - Kevin Booker (Winnipeg)
Vice-President Sport Development - Nicole Madsen (Hamiota)
Vice-President Official Development- Ashton Liskie (Winnipeg)

References

 
Baseball governing bodies in Canada
Sports organizations established in 1968
1968 establishments in Manitoba